Marc Saner (born 1961) is a Full Professor at the University of Ottawa, Canada and Departmental Science Advisor to Natural Resources Canada.

Education
Saner studied biology at the University of Basel, Switzerland (PhD, 1991) and philosophy at Carleton University, Canada (MA 1999).

Career
Upon completion of his doctorate, he served as a regulatory scientist at the Pest Management Regulatory Agency. He then obtained a graduate degree in philosophy and became the Managing Director of the Ethics and Policy Issues Centre (EPIC) at Carleton University.

He served as a Director at the Institute on Governance from 2003-2006 and as the Executive Vice-President and Director of Assessments at the Council of Canadian Academies (CCA) from 2006-2007 and the Executive Director of the Regulatory Governance Initiative at the School of Public Policy and Administration at Carleton University from 2008-2010.

In 2010, Marc Saner became the Inaugural Director of the Institute for Science, Society and Policy (ISSP) at the University of Ottawa. He developed the ISSP from 2010-2015 and established a network of fellows, advisors and faculty, as well as the institute's first graduate program.

He is currently a professor at the University of Ottawa, where he chairs the Department of Geography, Environment and Geomatics. He also serves part-time as Departmental Science Advisor to Natural Resources Canada.

Publications

Book chapters
 Saner M. (2013) The Role of Adaptation in the Governance of Emerging Technologies in Marchant, G. E., Abbott, K. W., and Allenby, B. (eds.), Innovative Governance Models for Emerging Technologies, (Edward Elgar Publishing, Northampton, MA), pp. 92–107.
 Saner M. & Geelen J. (2012) Identity in a Technological Society: Governance Implications, Chapter 37 in Luppicini, Rocci (ed.), Handbook of Research on Technoself: Identity in a Technological Society, (IGI Global, Hershey, PA, 2012), pp. 720–741.
 Saner M. (2008) Ethics, Governance and Regulation and the Environmental Aspects of Aquaculture in Culver, Keith and David Castle (eds.), Aquaculture, Innovation and Social Transformation (Springer, International Library of Environmental, Agricultural, and Food Ethics Vol. 17), pp. 115–121.
Saner M., D.R. Clements, M.R. Hall, D.J. Doohan & C.W. Crompton (2005). The Biology of Canadian weeds. 105. Linaria vulgaris Mill. in P.B. Cavers (ed.), The Biology of Canadian Weeds (The Agricultural Institute of Ottawa), Vol. 5. pp. 16-29.
Saner M. (2002). Real and Metaphorical Moral Limits in the Biotechnology Debate in Ruse, M. and David Castle (eds.), Genetically Modified Foods (Prometheus Books, New York), pp. 77-79.

Monographs
 A Primer on Scientific Risk Assessment at Health Canada by Marc Saner (2010), Health Canada Catalogue number: H22-4/3-2010.  
International Approaches to the Regulatory Governance of Nanotechnology by Jennifer Pelley and Marc Saner (2009), School of Public Policy and Administration, Carleton University.  
A Primer for Scientists: Ethical Issues of Environmental Biotechnology Research by Marc Saner (2001), Environment Canada Catalogue number: En40-645/2001E-IN.

References

External links 
 University of Ottawa
Publications at Academia.edu

1961 births
Living people
University of Basel alumni
Carleton University alumni
Academic staff of the University of Ottawa